Leclercq, LeClercq, or Le Clercq is a surname, and may refer to:

 Arnaud Leclercq (born 1967), French author
 Auguste Bouché-Leclercq, French historian
 Carlotta Leclercq (1838–1893), British actor
 Chrétien Le Clercq, 17th century, New France missionary
 Daniel Leclercq (1949–2019), football player
 Eugène Leclercq (1832–1908), draughts world champion
 Fabien Leclercq (born 1972), French footballer
 Frédéric Leclercq (born 1978), bassist
 Hugo Pierre Leclercq, better known by his stage name Madeon, a French DJ.
 Jacques Leclercq (1891–1971), Belgian theologian and priest
 Jean Leclercq (disambiguation), several people
 Jean-Claude Leclercq (born 1962), French bicycle racer
 Jean-Marc Leclercq, French singer
 Jeanne Leclercq (1868–1914), French opera singer
 Julien Leclercq (disambiguation), several people
 Michel Leclercq, French billionaire businessman
 Olivier Leclercq, French businessman
 Patrick Leclercq (born 1938), Minister of State of Monaco
 Pierre-Georges LeClercq, Belgian long-distance runner
Robin Leclercq (born 1952), French former footballer
 Rose Leclercq (1843–1899), English actor
 Salomone Leclercq  (1745–1792), French Roman Catholic martyr and saint.
 Suzanne Leclercq (1901–1994), Belgian paleobotanist
 Tanaquil LeClercq (1929–2000), ballet dancer

See also
LeClerc (similar spelling)

French-language surnames